Michael Rucker may refer to:

Mike Rucker (born 1975), American football defensive end
Michael Rucker (baseball) (born 1994), American baseball pitcher